Fifth Ward or Ward 5 may refer to one of the following places:

Fifth Ward, Houston, a neighborhood of Houston
5th Ward of New Orleans, a ward of New Orleans
Fifth Ward (Atlanta), a historical ward of Atlanta
Fifth Ward, Louisiana, a census-designated place in Avoyelles Parish
Fifth Ward, Philadelphia, a ward of Philadelphia
Ward 5 (Mississauga), a municipal ward in Mississauga, Ontario
Ward 5, St. Louis City, an aldermanic ward of St. Louis
Ward 5, one of the neighborhoods of Washington, D.C.
Ward 5, the name of several wards of Zimbabwe
West Carleton-March Ward, Ottawa (also known as Ward 5)

In other uses, it may refer to:
Fifth Ward (film), a 1997 drama film
5th Ward The Series, a 2018 television series based on the film
Fifth Ward Democrats, American football team